Dermot K. Weld (born 29 July 1948), a former jockey is one of Ireland's most successful racehorse trainers. He holds the record for the most winners trained in Ireland (2,578 set in August 2000).

Weld maintains his stable, Rosewell House, in Curragh, Ireland. He is married, with two sons.

Irish bookmakers, Paddy Power, tried to launch a campaign to change the name of the Galway Races to the Dermot Weld Retirement Fund Races; however, it proved to be unsuccessful.

He was played by Brendan Gleeson in the feature film The Cup.

Education 
Educated at Newbridge College, a qualified veterinarian (UCD 1970). In 2016, Weld was awarded UCD Alumnus of the Year in Veterinary Medicine.

Major wins
 Ireland
 Irish 1000 Guineas - (5) - Prince's Polly (1982), Trusted Partner (1988), Nightime (2006), Bethrah (2010), Homeless Songs (2022)
 Irish 2000 Guineas - (1) - Flash of Steel (1986)
 Irish Derby - (3) - Zagreb (1996), Grey Swallow (2004), Harzand (2016)
 Irish Oaks - (2) - Blue Wind (1981), Dance Design (1996)
 Irish St Leger - (9) - Vintage Crop (1993, 1994), Vinnie Roe (2001, 2002, 2003, 2004), Voleuse de Coeurs (2013), Search For A Song (2019,2020)
 Matron Stakes - (3) - Valley Forge (1977), Dress to Thrill (2002), Emulous (2011)
 Moyglare Stud Stakes - (2) - Flutter Away (1987), Tahiyra (2022) 
 National Stakes - (5) - Diamonds Are Trumps (1977), Day Is Done (1981), Definite Article (1994), Mus-If (1998), Refuse to Bend (2002)
 Phoenix Stakes - (2) - Kilijaro (1978), Smokey Lady (1979)
 Pretty Polly Stakes - (4) - Market Booster (1992), Dance Design (1996, 1997), Chinese White (2010)
 Tattersalls Gold Cup - (6) - Cockney Lass (1987), Definite Article (1996), Dance Design (1997), Grey Swallow (2005), Casual Conquest (2009), Fascinating Rock (2016)
 Punchestown Gold Cup - (1) -  Pillar Brae (1980) 
 Alanna Homes Champion Novice Hurdle - (1) - Treble Bob (1995)
 Arkle Novice Chase - (1) - General Idea (1992)
 Champion Four Year Old Hurdle - (2) - Allen’s Mistake (1988), Hisaabaat (2012)
 Champion INH Flat Race - (1) - Hidden Universe (2010)
 Chanelle Pharma Novice Hurdle - (2) -  Midsummer Gamble (1987), General Idea (1991)
 December Festival Hurdle - (2) -  Fortune and Fame (1993), Unaccompanied (2011)
 Herald Champion Novice Hurdle - (1) - Fortune and Fame (1992)
 Irish Champion Hurdle - (2) -  Fortune and Fame (1994,1995)
 Ryanair Gold Cup - (1) - General Idea (1992)
 Savills Chase - (1) - General Idea (1992)
 Spring Juvenile Hurdle - (3) - Iron County Xmas (1998), Unaccompanied (2011), Hisaabaat (2012)

 Australia
 Melbourne Cup - (2) - Vintage Crop (1993), Media Puzzle (2002)

 France
 Prix de l'Abbaye de Longchamp - (2) - Committed (1984, 1985)
 Prix Royal-Oak - (1) - Vinnie Roe (2001)
 Prix Vermeille - (1) - Tarnawa (2020)
 Prix de l'Opéra - (1) - Tarnawa (2020)

 Germany
 Bayerisches Zuchtrennen - (1) - Market Booster (1993

 Great Britain
 2000 Guineas - (1) - Refuse to Bend (2003)
 Ascot Gold Cup - (1) - Rite of Passage (2010)
 Champion Stakes - (1) - Fascinating Rock (2015) 
Cheveley Park Stakes - (1) - Sookera (1977)
Coronation Stakes - (1) - Sutton Place (1978)
Golden Jubilee Stakes - (2) - Committed (1984), Big Shuffle (1987)
Middle Park Stakes - (1) - Steel Heart (1974)
Nunthorpe Stakes - (1) - Committed (1984)
Epsom Derby - (1) - Harzand (2016)
Epsom Oaks - (1) - Blue Wind (1981)
Prince of Wales's Stakes - (1) - Free Eagle (2015)
St. James's Palace Stakes - (1) - Brief Truce (1992)
Sun Chariot Stakes - (1) - Dress to Thrill (2002)
Anniversary 4-Y-O Novices' Hurdle - (1) -  Dark Raven (1986)
Baring Bingham Novices' Hurdle - (1) - Windsor Park (2015)
Champion Bumper - (1) -  Silver Concorde (2014)
Triumph Hurdle - (1) - Rare Holiday (1990)

 Hong Kong
Hong Kong Mile - (1) - Additional Risk (1991)

 Italy
Derby Italiano - (1) - In a Tiff (1992)

 United States
American Derby - (3) - Pine Dance (2000), Evolving Tactics (2003), Simple Exchange (2004)
American Oaks - (1) - Dimitrova (2003)
Belmont Stakes - (1) - Go and Go (1990)
Breeders' Cup Turf - (1) - Tarnawa (2020)
Flower Bowl Invitational Stakes - (1) - Dimitrova (2003)
Man o' War Stakes - (1) - Zhukova (2017)
Secretariat Stakes - (1) - Winchester (2008)
Matriarch Stakes - (1)  - Dress to Thrill (2002)

References

External links
 Go Racing Ireland: Dermot Weld Profile. Access date 2007-11-25.
 Weld Seals Irish Success. BBC Sport, 5 November 2002.  Access date 2007-11-26.

1948 births
Living people
Irish racehorse trainers
Irish veterinarians
People educated at Newbridge College